is a dating sim developed and published by Konami for the Nintendo DS handheld video game console. It was released in Japan in 2009. Several updates and sequels have followed, including one for iOS in 2011. It has not been released outside Japan.

Characters

 A second year High School student just transferred to Towano High School. Soon after, he joins the library committee, the tennis club and a part-time job at a family restaurant. In the LovePlus Rinko Days manga, his name is Wataru Aikawa.

 

 A second-year high school student who goes to the same after-school tennis club with the protagonist. She comes from a well-off family and has lived a sheltered life, having no experience in many "normal" things like eating a hamburger combo, going out with her friends after the club, or watching TV. Her classmates shy away from her perfectionism, which is why she has few friends.

 

 A first-year high school student who the protagonist meets after being forced to join the library committee. She constantly wears earphones and has an attitude that keeps people away from her. Rinko's attitude stems from her feeling alienated and unwanted in her home after her father remarried, bringing a new mother and younger brother into the house. "Whenever I am home, the atmosphere darkens", as Rinko described. She wanders the streets after school, avoiding going back to an unwelcoming home. She likes punk rock and fighting games.
 The character concept was taken from Haruki Murakami's "Dance, Dance, Dance" character "Yuki".

 

 A third-year high school student working part-time in a family restaurant, where the protagonist meets her. She is the dependable big sister from whom everyone asks help. She has a mole under her right eye and likes housework and horror movies.
 In an early development setting she was meant to be a college student with light makeup. The latter remained part of her appearance during game release.
 In November 2009, a Japanese man and player of LovePlus "married" this character, provoking widespread media attention.

LovePlus+
LovePlus+ is the same as the original LovePlus, although with new content, including field trips, fitness modes, sick days, Taisen Puzzle-Dama, capsule toys and more. Almost everything from the original game also makes an appearance in LovePlus+, along with many new ways to interact with the girls. Data can also be transferred from the original game to LovePlus+.

Anti-piracy measures have also been upgraded.

The game was released in Japan on June 24, 2010.

LovePlus i
LovePlus i is an iOS app that was released on December 12, 2011. Manaka, Rinko, and Nene are sold separately for 600 yen each.

Manga
In early 2010, Kodansha announced that it would launch LovePlus spinoff manga serials starting in April through early May in five different Kodansha magazines: Manaka, Rinko and Nene each have their own storyline.

 LovePlus Manaka Days by Mikami Akitsu in Monthly Shōnen Rival
 LovePlus Rinko Days by Kōji Seo in Bessatsu Shōnen Magazine
 LovePlus Nene Days by Takaki Kugatsu in Monthly Young Magazine
 LovePlus Girls Talk by Daisuke Sakura in Magazine E-no
  by Hiroaki Wakamiya in good! Afternoon

Sequels
A sequel was released for the Nintendo 3DS on February 14, 2012 titled New LovePlus. An updated version of New LovePlus called New LovePlus+ was released for Nintendo 3DS on March 27, 2014.

LovePlus Collection
LovePlus Collection is based on the original game, but it is made for mobile phones and uses a card battle system to develop the player's relationship with the girls. It also features a new character, Akira Yukino, a sophomore. It was released as a standalone app at iTunes and Google Play (although the player needs a GREE account to play) on April 18, 2013.

References

External links

 LovePluss official site 

2009 video games
2010 video games
Dating sims
IOS games
Japan-exclusive video games
Konami franchises
Konami games
Nintendo DS games
Nintendo 3DS games
Nintendo 3DS eShop games
Seinen manga
Shōnen manga
Video games scored by Akari Kaida
Works by Kōji Seo
Video games developed in Japan